Geert Lovink (born 1959, Amsterdam) is the founding director of the Institute of Network Cultures, whose goals are to explore, document and feed the potential for socio-economical change of the new media field through events, publications and open dialogue. As theorist, activist and net critic, Lovink has made an effort in helping to shape the development of the web.

Since 2004 Lovink is a researcher at the Faculty of Digital Media and Creative Industries at the Hogeschool van Amsterdam (HvA) where he heads the Institute of Network Cultures. From 2007 till 2017 he was a Professor of Media Theory at the European Graduate School where he supervised five PhD students. From 2004-2013 he was an Associate Professor of New Media at the University of Amsterdam (UvA). In December 2021 he was appointed Professor of Art and Network Cultures at the UvA Art History Department. The Chair (one day a week) is supported by the HvA. Lovink earned his master's degree in political science at the University of Amsterdam, holds a PhD from the University of Melbourne and has been a postdoctoral fellow at the University of Queensland.

Activities

Since the early eighties, Lovink has been involved in a range of different projects and initiatives in the field of new media.

 1983 Member of Adilkno
 1989–94 Editor for the media art magazine Mediamatic
 1993 Co-founder of the support campaign for independent media in South-East Europe Press Now
 1994 Co-founder of the Amsterdam-based free community network Digital City (DDS)
1994 Co-founder of the internet workspace and content provider for the arts desk.nl. 
 1995 Co-founder (together with Pit Schultz) of the international nettime circle
 1996–99 Public researcher at the Society for Old and New Media, De Waag
 1996 Coordinating projects and teaching once a year at the IMI mediaschool in Osaka/Japan
 2000 organizer of the Tulipomania Dotcom conference
 2000–08 Consultant/editor to the exchange program of Waag Society and Sarai New Media Centre (Delhi)
 2001 Co-founder of FibreCulture, a forum for Australian Internet research and culture
 2002 Co-organizer of Dark Markets, on new media and democracy in times of crisis in Vienna
 2003 Co-organizer of Uncertain States of Reportage in Delhi
 2004 Co-organizer (together with Trebor Scholz) of the conference on the art of (online) collaboration Free Cooperation at SUNY Buffalo

On 31 May 2010 Geert Lovink took part in Quit Facebook Day and deleted his Facebook account.

In 2020 two text archives of Geert Lovink were preserved and transferred to the INC website: The Adilkno/Bilwet archive, once hosted by desk.nl (1990-1999): https://networkcultures.org/bilwet-archive/ and the text archive of geertlovink.org (2000-2010): https://networkcultures.org/geertlovink-archive/.

Theories
Geert Lovink was one of the key theorists behind the concept of tactical media – the use of media technologies as a tool for critical theory to become artistic practice. As an Internet activist, he describes tactical media as a "deliberately slippery term, a tool for creating 'temporary consensus zones' based on unexpected alliances. A temporary alliance of hackers, artists, critics, journalists and activists."
In essence, he believes that these new resources of which audiences could become participants in actions against higher powers became an area in which many different types of people could unite. Lovink also was a founder of the early web mailing list "nettime", as well as a number of other projects.

Bibliography
 Lovink, Geert. Dynamics of Critical Internet Culture (1994-2001), PhD thesis, English Department, The University of Melbourne, 2002.
 Lovink, Geert. Dark Fiber: Tracking Critical Internet Culture, Cambridge Mass.: MIT Press, 2002. 
 Lovink, Geert. Uncanny Networks, Cambridge Mass.: MIT Press, 2002.
 Lovink, Geert. My First Recession, Rotterdam: NAi/V2_Publishing, 2003.
 Lovink, Geert. The Principle of Notworking, Amsterdam: Amsterdam University Press, 2005.
 Lovink, Geert. "New Media, Art and Science: Explorations Beyond the Official Discourse", in Scott McQuire and Nikos Papastergiadis (eds), Empires, Ruins + Networks: The Transcultural Agenda in Art, Melbourne: University of Melbourne Press, 2005.
 Lovink, Geert. Tactical Media, the Second Decade, Brazilian Submidialogia, 2005.
 Lovink, Geert and Rossiter, Ned. "Dawn of the organized networks", Fibreculture Journal 5 2005.
 Lovink, Geert. Zero Comments: Blogging and Critical Internet Culture, London and New York: Routledge, 2007.
 Lovink, Geert. Networks Without a Cause: A Critique of Social Media, Cambridge and Malden: Polity, 2012. .
 Lovink, Geert and Rasch, Miriam (eds), Unlike Us Reader: Social Media Monopolies and Their Alternatives, Amsterdam: Institute of Network Cultures, 2013. , paperback, 384 pages.
 Lovink, Geert. Social Media Abyss, Critical Internet Cultures and the Force of Negation, Cambridge and Malden: Polity, 2016. .
 Lovink, Geert, Tkacz, Nathaniel, and de Vries, Patricia (eds), MoneyLab Reader: An Intervention in Digital Economy, Amsterdam: Institute of Network Cultures, 2015. .
Gloerich, Inte, Lovink, Geert, de Vries, Patricia, MoneyLab Reader 2, Overcoming the Hype, Amsterdam: Institute of Network Cultures, 2017. 
Lovink, Geert, Rossiter, Ned, Organization after Social Media, Brooklyn: Minor Compositions,   http://www.minorcompositions.info/?p=857.
Lovink, Geert, Sad by Design, Eurozone, January 2019, https://www.eurozine.com/sad-by-design/. 
Lovink, Geert, Sad by Design, On Platform Nihilism, London: Pluto Press, 2019.
Gerritzen, Mieke, Lovink, Geert, Made in China, Designed in California, Criticized in Europe, Amsterdam: The Image Society, 2019, https://networkcultures.org/blog/publication/amsterdam-design-manifesto/.
Lovink, Geert, Stuck on the Platform, Reclaiming the Internet, Amsterdam: Valiz, 2022.
Lovink, Geert, Extinction Internet, UvA inaugural speech, November 2022, https://networkcultures.org/blog/publication/extinction-internet/.

References

1959 births
Living people
Academic staff of the University of Amsterdam
Academic staff of European Graduate School
Mass media theorists
Philosophers of technology